The 3rd World Table Tennis Championships were held in Budapest from January 14 to January 21, 1929.

Medalists

Team

Individual

References

External links
ITTF Museum

 
World Table Tennis Championships
World Table Tennis Championships
World Table Tennis Championships
Table tennis competitions in Hungary
International sports competitions in Budapest
1920s in Budapest